Daniel Mancini (born 11 November 1996) is an Argentine professional footballer who plays as a winger for Greek Super League club Panathinaikos.

Career
Mancini made his professional debut for Newell's Old Boys in a 3–0 win over Racing Club de Avellaneda on 12 July 2015. He transferred to Bordeaux in January 2017.

Aris
On 22 August 2019, Aris and Bordeaux came to an agreement for the transfer of the Argentine midfielder to the Greek club. Four days later, he arrived to Thessaloniki, ahead of passing his medical tests and signing his new contract. For his purchase, Aris offered an estimated amount of €500,000, making him one of the biggest investments in the history of the club.

On 24 June 2020, he scored his first goal in a 2-2 home draw for the Greek Cup semi finals, which resulted in his team being eliminated.

On 4 October 2020, he scored his first league goal, helping to a 1-0 away win against Panathinaikos, keeping his team on top of the table. This win was the first away from home against Panathinaikos since 2007, and marked Aris' best start in 20 years.

On 20 January 2021, he scored with a helping to a 2-0 home win against Asteras Tripoli for the first leg of the Greek Cup round of 16. On 11 April 2021, he scored in a 3-1 home loss against AEK Athens. On 25 April 2021, Mancini scored in an eventual 1-1 away draw against Asteras Tripoli.

On 16 August 2021, he agreed to a contract extension until the summer of 2024.

His first goal for the 2021–22 season came in a 3-1 away win against Atromitos, on 27 September 2021. On 28 November 2021, with an excellent kick scored the only goal sealing a vital 1-0 away win against rivals PAOK, in an episodic game that was accompanied by the invasion of the fans of PAOK on the field.

On 23 February 2022, Mancini scored a brace in a 3-0 home win against Atromitos, keeping his team's hopes for a play-off spot alive.

In the 2022–23 season's opener Mancini scored a brace helping to a 3-0 home win against Levadiakos. Roughly ten days later, Mancini came close to completing a move to Omonia, but the negotiations between the Cypriot club and Aris fell through.

In the late days of September, Aris received another offer for the services of the Argentine winger from an Abu Dhabi based club believed to be in the region of €2,500,000.

Panathinaikos
In 26 January 2023, he signed for Panathinaikos. On 12 February 2023, Mancini made his return to the Kleanthis Vikelidis Stadium and scored his first goal for the Greens in a 2-1 win over his former club Aris.

Personal life 
Mancini holds an Italian passport, as he is of Italian descent.

Career statistics

Honours

Individual
Aris Thessaloniki Player of the Season: 2021–22

References

External links

 
 
 Profile at LFP
 

1996 births
Living people
People from La Matanza Partido
Association football midfielders
Argentine footballers
Argentine people of Italian descent
Argentine expatriate footballers
Argentine expatriate sportspeople
Argentine expatriate sportspeople in France
Argentine expatriate sportspeople in Greece
Argentine Primera División players
Ligue 1 players
Ligue 2 players
Super League Greece players
Newell's Old Boys footballers
FC Girondins de Bordeaux players
Tours FC players
AJ Auxerre players
Aris Thessaloniki F.C. players
Panathinaikos F.C. players
Expatriate footballers in France
Expatriate footballers in Greece
Sportspeople from Buenos Aires Province